Jeff Hughell (born December 4, 1979) is the former bassist for Asylum, Vile, and Brain Drill and the current bassist for Six Feet Under and Reciprocal. He has released four solo albums and has played bass on multiple records as a session player.

Hughell is currently endorsed by Warwick bass guitars, Seymour Duncan pickups and Dean Markley strings. He is a prominent user of seven-string bass guitars.

Hughell also plays guitar and piano. He played all the guitar parts on Six Feet Under's album Torment and frequently plays both guitar and piano on his solo albums.

Discography 
Osmium
From the Ashes (2003)

Brain Drill
Apocalyptic Feasting (2008)

Reciprocal
Reciprocal (2009)
 New Order of the Ages (2013)

Solo
I Came to Hate (2009) 
Chaos Labyrinth (2013)
Trinidad Scorpion Hallucinations (2016)
Sleep Deprivation (2019)

Feared
Furor Incarnatus (2013)

Skin the Lamb
Monolithic (2016)

Six Feet Under 
Unborn (2013)
Torment (2017)
Unburied (2018)
 Nightmares of the Decomposed (2020)

References

Living people
1979 births
American heavy metal bass guitarists
American male bass guitarists
Six Feet Under (band) members
21st-century American bass guitarists
21st-century American male musicians